The 1964–65 NBA season was the Detroit Pistons' 17th season in the NBA and its eighth season in the city of Detroit.  The team played at Cobo Arena in Detroit.

The team fired coach Charles Wolf after 11 games, naming 24-year old forward Dave DeBusschere player-manager.  The Pistons finished the season 31-49 (.388), 4th in the Western Division.  Before the season began, the team made a major trade to rid the team of players who had feuded with Wolf, adding Terry Dischinger, Don Kojis and Rod Thorn from the Baltimore Bullets for Bob Ferry, Bailey Howell, Les Hunter, Wali Jones and Don Ohl.  The trade was the largest in NBA history at the time.  Former Piston Gene Shue, coaching for Baltimore, assessed the trade thusly: “Detroit has the worst management in the league.”

Detroit was led on the season by forward DeBusschere (16.7 ppg, 11.1 rpg) and guard Dischinger (18.2 ppg, NBA All-Star).  Dischinger would leave the team after the season, as having a ROTC commission at Purdue, he would serve two years in the United States Army during the Vietnam War.

Roster

<noinclude>

Regular season

Season standings

x – clinched playoff spot

Record vs. opponents

Game log

Awards and records
Joe Caldwell, NBA All-Rookie Team 1st Team

References

Detroit Pistons seasons
Detroit
Detroit Pistons
Detroit Pistons